The list of Sigma Kappa sisters includes initiated members of Sigma Kappa Sorority.

Notable alumnae

Politics, law, and military

 Susan Eisenhower (Epsilon Epsilon) – expert on international security, space policy, energy, and Russia–United States relations; granddaughter of U.S. President Dwight Eisenhower
 Susan Johns (Alpha Chi) – Former member of the Kentucky Senate (1990-1994) and Kentucky House of Representatives (1996-2000)
 Margaret Chase Smith (Alpha) – First woman to sit in both houses of the United States Congress. Recipient of 95 honorary degrees, 1989 Presidential Medal of Freedom recipient
 Sarah Weddington (Zeta Nu) – Attorney for Norma McCorvey in Roe v. Wade, three-term member of the Texas House of Representatives, and assistant to U.S. President Jimmy Carter.

Science & educution

 Laura Deming (Theta Lambda) – 2011 Thiel Fellow and venture capitalist
Margaret Rhea Seddon (Lambda) – retired NASA astronaut, surgeon
Marjorie Townsend (Zeta) – first woman to manage a spacecraft launch for NASA

Athletics

Theresa Grentz (Theta) – 1992 coach of the bronze medal-winning United States women's national basketball team; former women's head basketball coach at University of Illinois (1995–2007), Rutgers (1976–1995), Big Ten Coach of the Year (1997, 1998).
Anna McCune Harper (Lambda) – 1931 Wimbledon Mixed Doubles Champion and professional tennis player inducted into the California Women Athletes Hall of Fame. Sigma Kappa national president from 1939-1942.
Nancy Lopez (Theta Xi) – professional golfer
Angela Stanford (Kappa Eta) – professional golfer

Entertainment and literature

Connie Britton (Zeta Lambda) - actor
Mary Jane Clark (Phi) – author
Lindsay Czarniak (Delta Rho) – sports anchor and reporter at ESPN
Nina Davuluri (Alpha Mu) – Miss New York 2014, Miss America 2014
Glennon Doyle (Delta Rho) – author and public speaker
Tara Gray (Theta Xi) – Miss Alabama USA 2002
Judith Guest (Alpha Mu) – author of Ordinary People
 Kate Michael (Epsilon Epsilon) – Miss District of Columbia USA 2006
 Anitra Mohl (Epsilon Lambda) – top 5 in The Bachelor with Charlie O'Connell
 Lauren Vizza (Beta Epsilon) – Miss Louisiana 2012, Miss Louisiana USA 2017
 Maitland Ward (Gamma Theta) – actress in Boy Meets World, The Bold and the Beautiful, and White Chicks
 Melissa Clark Whitworth (Beta Epsilon) – Miss Louisiana 2003, married to Andrew Whitworth.

References

Lists of members of United States student societies
sisters